The 2023 ARCA Menards Series East will be the 37th season of the ARCA Menards Series East, a regional stock car racing series sanctioned by NASCAR in the United States. The season will begin on March 25 with the Pensacola 200 at Five Flags Speedway and will end on September 14 with the Bush's Beans 200 at Bristol Motor Speedway.

Sammy Smith, the defending series champion in 2021 and 2022, will run full-time for Joe Gibbs Racing in the NASCAR Xfinity Series in 2023 and therefore will not return to run full-time in the ARCA Menards Series East and defend his title. William Sawalich will replace him in the No. 18 car in 2023, which goes back to being owned by JGR after being owned by Kyle Busch Motorsports in 2022.

Teams and drivers

Confirmed full-time teams

Confirmed part-time teams/drivers

Silly season news and updates

Confirmed changes

Teams
 On December 9, 2022, it was announced that the No. 18 car would go back to being owned by Joe Gibbs Racing in 2023. It was owned by Kyle Busch Motorsports in 2022.
 On January 8, 2023, it was announced that Tim Goulet Enterprises would rename to Rise Motorsports in 2023 and continue to field the No. 31 car in the main ARCA Series and the East Series for Rita Goulet (nee Thomason) and Stephen Leicht. On February 13, it was announced that they would run the full East Series season with Rita in 2023. Goulet and Leicht are both scheduled to run the main ARCA/East Series combination race at Bristol so the team will likely field two cars in that race.
 On January 13, 2023, Rev Racing announced that they would field a full-time car in the East Series again in 2023: the No. 6 driven by Lavar Scott. The team last fielded a full-time East Series car in 2021 and only fielded part-time cars in the East Series in 2022.
 On January 18, 2023, it was announced that longtime main ARCA Series team Venturini Motorsports would field a full-time car in the East Series for the first time since 2020 in 2023: the No. 15 driven by Sean Hingorani.
 On February 3, 2023, it was announced that Shane Huffman, who was previously the crew chief for Bret Holmes Racing in the Truck and ARCA Series, would form a new ARCA and late model racing team, Pinnacle Racing Group, with spotter Lorin Ranier and former driver Josh Wise and would run full-time in the East Series in 2023, fielding the No. 28 Chevrolet.
 On February 24, 2023, it was revealed that Lowden Jackson Motorsports would debut in the East Series in 2023 after purchasing Fords from David Gilliland Racing which switched to Toyota and renamed to TRICON Garage. The team will field the No. 41 Ford driven by Tyler Reif for the full season.

Drivers
 On December 6, 2022, it was announced that Zachary Tinkle, who ran the full season in the main ARCA Series aside from the race at Mid-Ohio, would run full-time in the East Series in the No. 11 car for Fast Track Racing in 2023. Fast Track was one of the teams he drove part-time for in 2022.
 On December 9, 2022, it was announced that William Sawalich would drive the No. 18 car part-time in 2023 and the car would go back to being owned by Joe Gibbs Racing. It was owned by Kyle Busch Motorsports in 2022.
 On January 13, 2023, Rev Racing announced that Lavar Scott, who has been a driver for the team in late model racing, would drive full-time for the team in the East Series in 2023 in their No. 6 car. Andrés Pérez de Lara will also drive for Rev full-time in the main ARCA Series in the No. 2 car and will therefore be in the four main combination races the East Series has with the main ARCA Series.
 On January 18, 2023, it was announced that Sean Hingorani, who drove part-time in the West Series for Nascimento Motorsports and Bill McAnally Racing in 2022, would drive full-time in the East Series for Venturini Motorsports in 2023 in their No. 15 car. Hingorani will also drive the same car full-time in the West Series in 2023, attempting to win both championships in the same year.
 On February 13, 2023, Rise Motorsports announced that Rita Goulet (nee Thomason) would run full-time in the East Series in their No. 31 car in 2023.
 On February 24, 2023, Tyler Reif revealed to Frontstretch that he would run the full season in the East Series in 2023 in the Lowden Jackson Motorsports No. 41 car in addition to running full-time in the West Series for the team. He will attempt to win both championships in the same year.

Schedule
The full schedule was announced on November 22. Some race dates were announced before then. There are eight races on the 2023 schedule, up from seven in 2022.

Note: Races highlighted in gold are combination events with the ARCA Menards Series.

Schedule changes
 On August 9, 2022, Mark Kristl from Frontstretch reported that Flat Rock Speedway could be added to the East Series schedule in 2023. This was officially announced by ARCA on November 18. The race at Flat Rock, which will be on May 20, replaces the race at New Smyrna Speedway, which had been the season-opener for the East Series from 2014 to 2022.
 On November 11, 2022, it was announced that the main ARCA Series race at Lucas Oil Indianapolis Raceway Park would be a combination race with the East Series in 2023, giving the series a fourth combination race on top of the three returning ones from 2022 (Iowa, Milwaukee and Bristol).

Broadcasting
After previously only broadcasting about half of the main ARCA Series races for several years, usually only the races that were on the same weekend at the same track as a NASCAR Cup, Xfinity and/or Truck race, Fox will broadcast all 20 main ARCA Series races in 2023 and this includes all four combination races with the East Series (Iowa, IRP, Milwaukee and Bristol). Previously, Bristol was the only East Series race televised on Fox as they were also broadcasting the Truck Series race there on that weekend.

See also
 2023 NASCAR Cup Series
 2023 NASCAR Xfinity Series
 2023 NASCAR Craftsman Truck Series
 2023 ARCA Menards Series
 2023 ARCA Menards Series West
 2023 NASCAR Pinty's Series
 2023 NASCAR Whelen Euro Series
 2023 SRX Series

References

ARCA Menards Series East
ARCA Menards Series East
ARCA Menards Series East
ARCA Menards Series East